James H. Nave (1864 - October 6, 1949) was an American architect based in Lewiston, Idaho.  He designed a number of works which are listed on the National Register of Historic Places (NRHP) for their architecture.

Early life
Nave was born in Fort Wayne, Indiana in 1864. Nave came from Iola, Kansas to Lewiston in 1903.

Career
Nave and his firm competed with other architectural firms in Lewiston and in Spokane, Washington to get commissions to design public buildings, commercial blocks, and large homes.  Nave's firm won a number of these commissions and is credited with 94 works between 1903 and 1923.  Nave designed just two churches,

St. Stanislaus. It and Lewiston's Baptist Church are the only two churches
attributed to this architect, who made his reputation primarily through designing schools.

According to Egleston, "By 1909 Nave was obtaining commissions for commercial and institutional buildings as his residential business declined. His institutional work was Georgian Revival, while his commercial commissions were completed in the Romanesque and Renaissance Revival styles. In her book, Building Idaho, Jennifer Eastman Attebery writes that Nave's work shows a preference for stone and a 'fragmented use of classical motifs.' This affinity for stonework is not surprising, given the fact that he owned a stone quarry in nearby Clarkston [Washington], to which he devoted his energy after he left architectural work in 1933."

Works include:
Bollinger Hotel (1903)
James Asposas House, 1610 Fifteenth Ave., Lewiston, ID, NRHP-listed
William and Elizabeth McLaren House (1904), 1602 15th Ave., Lewiston, ID, NRHP-listed
Nave Apartments (1904), 600 block of 8th St., Lewiston, ID, built of sandstone from Nave's quarry, "Swallow's Nest". NRHP-listed
Means Building (1905)
St. Stanislaus Catholic Church (1905), 633 5th Ave., Lewiston, ID, NRHP-listed
Agnes M. Tamblyn House (1905), 1506 Seventeenth Ave., Lewiston, ID, NRHP-listed
Kettenbach Building (1906)
Frank Booth House (1907), 1608 Seventeenth Ave., Lewiston, ID, NRHP-listed
First Presbyterian Church(1909), Locust and 1st St., E., Lapwai, ID, NRHP-listed
Garfield School (1910), 2912 5th Ave., Lewiston, ID, NRHP-listed
Gaylord Thompson House (1913), 1824 Seventeenth Ave., Lewiston, ID, NRHP-listed
Breier Building (1923), 631-33 Main St., Lewiston, ID, NRHP-listed
Bank of Juliaetta, 301 Main St., Juliaetta, ID, NRHP-listed
Patrick J. and Lydia Hester House, 1622 Fifteenth Ave., Lewiston, ID, NRHP-listed
Lewiston's Baptist church
a number of schools in Camas Prairie, Idaho
the Wilkes block in Grangeville, Idaho
a bank in Glendale, Arizona
the Bradford Building in Clarkston, Washington, a three-story steel and glass commercial structure

Personal life and death
Nave was married twice. After his first wife died, he married Mae Russell in 1937. He had two sons and one daughter. He died on October 6, 1949, in Lewiston, Idaho.

References

1864 births
1949 deaths
People from Fort Wayne, Indiana
People from Lewiston, Idaho
20th-century American architects
Architects from Idaho